The 1969 Baltimore Orioles season was a season in American baseball. In the first season after the American League was split into two divisions, the Orioles won the first-ever American League East title, finishing first with a record of 109 wins and 53 losses, 19 games ahead of the world champion Detroit Tigers.

After the regular season, the Orioles went on to the 1st American League Championship Series, where they faced the Minnesota Twins. They swept the Twins in the 1969 ALCS, but lost the World Series to the upstart National League champion New York Mets in five games.

The team was managed by Earl Weaver, and played their home games at Memorial Stadium.

Offseason 
 October 15, 1968: Wally Bunker was drafted from the Orioles by the Kansas City Royals with the 25th pick in the 1968 Major League Baseball expansion draft.
 December 4, 1968: Curt Blefary and John Mason (minors) were traded by the Orioles to the Houston Astros for Mike Cuellar, Enzo Hernández, and Elijah Johnson (minors).
 December 2, 1968: Bobby Darwin was drafted from the Orioles by the Los Angeles Dodgers in the 1968 rule 5 draft.
 January 20, 1969: Ron Stone was traded by the Orioles to the Philadelphia Phillies for Clay Dalrymple.
 March 31, 1969: Gene Brabender and Gordy Lund were traded by the Orioles to the Seattle Pilots for Chico Salmon.

Spring training
The Baltimore Orioles held spring training at Miami Stadium in Miami for the 11th season.

Regular season 
On August 13, 1969, Jim Palmer threw the only no-hitter of his career.

Season standings

Record vs. opponents

Notable transactions 
 June 5, 1969: 1969 Major League Baseball draft
Dave Skaggs was drafted by the Orioles in the 6th round.
Dave Winfield was drafted by the Orioles in the 40th round, but did not sign.
 August 16, 1969: Bob Galasso was signed as an amateur free agent by the Orioles.

Roster

Game log

|-  style="background:#fcc; text-align:center;"
| 1 || April 8 || Red Sox || 4–5 (12)||  ||  ||  ||  ||  || 0–1 ||  ||  ||  ||  ||  || 
|-  style="background:#cfc; text-align:center;"
| 2 || April 10 || Red Sox || 2–1 (13)||  ||  ||  ||  ||  || 1–1 ||  ||  ||  ||  ||  ||
|-  style="background:#fcc; text-align:center;"
| 3 || April 11 || Senators || 0–4 ||  ||  ||  ||  ||  || 1–2 ||  ||  ||  ||  ||  ||
|-  style="background:#cfc; text-align:center;"
| 4 || April 12 || Senators || 9–0 ||  ||  ||  ||  ||  || 2–2 ||  ||  ||  ||  ||  ||
|-  style="background:#cfc; text-align:center;"
| 5 || April 13 || Senators || 2–0 ||  ||  ||  ||  ||  || 3–2 ||  ||  ||  ||  ||  ||
|-  style="background:#cfc; text-align:center;"
| 6 || April 13 || Senators || 9–0 ||  ||  ||  ||  ||  || 4–2 ||  ||  ||  ||  ||  ||
|-  style="background:#fcc; text-align:center;"
| 7 || April 14 || @ Red Sox || 3–5 ||  ||  ||  ||  ||  || 4–3 ||  ||  ||  ||  ||  ||  
|-  style="background:#cfc; text-align:center;"
| 8 || April 15 || @ Red Sox || 10–5 ||  ||  ||  ||  ||  || 5–3 ||  ||  ||  ||  ||  ||
|-  style="background:#cfc; text-align:center;"
| 9 || April 16 || @ Red Sox || 11–8 (8)||  ||  ||  ||  ||  || 6–3 ||  ||  ||  ||  ||  ||
|-  style="background:#cfc; text-align:center;"
| 10 || April 17 || @ Red Sox || 9–5 ||  ||  ||  ||  ||  || 7–3 ||  ||  ||  ||  ||  ||
|-  style="background:#cfc; text-align:center;"
| 11 || April 18 || @ Senators || 6–0 ||  ||  ||  ||  ||  || 8–3 ||  ||  ||  ||  ||  ||
|-  style="background:#fcc; text-align:center;"
| 12 || April 19 || @ Senators || 5–7 ||  ||  ||  ||  ||  || 8–4 ||  ||  ||  ||  ||  ||
|-  style="background:#cfc; text-align:center;"
| 13 || April 20 || @ Senators || 2–1 ||  ||  ||  ||  ||  || 9–4 ||  ||  ||  ||  ||  ||
|-  style="background:#fcc; text-align:center;"
| 14 || April 20 || @ Senators || 2–5 ||  ||  ||  ||  ||  || 9–5 ||  ||  ||  ||  ||  ||
|-  style="background:#cfc; text-align:center;"
| 15 || April 21 || Indians || 11–0 ||  ||  ||  ||  ||  || 10–5 ||  ||  ||  ||  ||  || 
|-  style="background:#cfc; text-align:center;"
| 16 || April 22 || Indians || 3–2 ||  ||  ||  ||  ||  || 11–5 ||  ||  ||  ||  ||  ||
|-  style="background:#cfc; text-align:center;"
| 17 || April 23 || Tigers || 3–2 (10)||  ||  ||  ||  ||  || 12–5 ||  ||  ||  ||  ||  ||
|-  style="background:#cfc; text-align:center;"
| 18 || April 24 || Tigers || 5–2 ||  ||  ||  ||  ||  || 13–5 ||  ||  ||  ||  ||  ||
|-  style="background:#fcc; text-align:center;"
| 19 || April 25 || Yankees || 2–7 ||  ||  ||  ||  ||  || 13–6 ||  ||  ||  ||  ||  || 
|-  style="background:#fcc; text-align:center;"
| 20 || April 26 || Yankees || 5–6 ||  ||  ||  ||  ||  || 13–7 ||  ||  ||  ||  ||  ||
|-  style="background:#cfc; text-align:center;"
| 21 || April 27 || Yankees || 6–0 ||  ||  ||  ||  ||  || 14–7 ||  ||  ||  ||  ||  ||
|-  style="background:#cfc; text-align:center;"
| 22 || April 27 || Yankees || 10–5 ||  ||  ||  ||  ||  || 15–7 ||  ||  ||  ||  ||  ||
|-  style="background:#cfc; text-align:center;"
| 23 || April 30 || @ Tigers || 3–2 ||  ||  ||  ||  ||  || 16–7 ||  ||  ||  ||  ||  || 
|-

|-  style="background:#fcc; text-align:center;"
| 24 || May 1 || @ Tigers || 0–2 ||  ||  ||  ||  ||  || 16–8 ||  ||  ||  ||  ||  ||
|-  style="background:#cfc; text-align:center;"
| 25 || May 2 || @ Yankees || 5–1 ||  ||  ||  ||  ||  || 17–8 ||  ||  ||  ||  ||  ||
|-  style="background:#cfc; text-align:center;"
| 26 || May 3 || @ Yankees || 5–4 ||  ||  ||  ||  ||  || 18–8 ||  ||  ||  ||  ||  ||
|-  style="background:#cfc; text-align:center;"
| 27 || May 4 || @ Yankees || 5–3 ||  ||  ||  ||  ||  || 19–8 ||  ||  ||  ||  ||  ||
|-  style="background:#cfc; text-align:center;"
| 28 || May 4 || @ Yankees || 14–2 ||  ||  ||  ||  ||  || 20–8 ||  ||  ||  ||  ||  ||
|-  style="background:#fcc; text-align:center;"
| 29 || May 6 || White Sox || 0–1 ||  ||  ||  ||  ||  || 20–9 ||  ||  ||  ||  ||  ||
|-  style="background:#fcc; text-align:center;"
| 30 || May 7 || White Sox || 4–6 ||  ||  ||  ||  ||  || 20–10 ||  ||  ||  ||  ||  ||
|-  style="background:#fcc; text-align:center;"
| 31 || May 9 || Royals || 2–4 ||  ||  ||  ||  ||  || 20–11 ||  ||  ||  ||  ||  ||
|-  style="background:#cfc; text-align:center;"
| 32 || May 10 || Royals || 6–5 ||  ||  ||  ||  ||  || 21–11 ||  ||  ||  ||  ||  ||
|-  style="background:#cfc; text-align:center;"
| 33 || May 11 || Royals || 5–0 ||  ||  ||  ||  ||  || 22–11 ||  ||  ||  ||  ||  ||
|-  style="background:#fcc; text-align:center;"
| 34 || May 13 || @ Twins || 2–4 ||  ||  ||  ||  ||  || 22–12 ||  ||  ||  ||  ||  ||
|-  style="background:#cfc; text-align:center;"
| 35 || May 14 || @ Twins || 9–8 ||  ||  ||  ||  ||  || 23–12 ||  ||  ||  ||  ||  ||
|-  style="background:#cfc; text-align:center;"
| 36 || May 15 || @ Twins || 5–0 ||  ||  ||  ||  ||  || 24–12 ||  ||  ||  ||  ||  ||
|-  style="background:#cfc; text-align:center;"
| 37 || May 16 || @ Royals || 5–3 (11)||  ||  ||  ||  ||  || 25–12 ||  ||  ||  ||  ||  ||
|-  style="background:#cfc; text-align:center;"
| 38 || May 17 || @ Royals || 4–2 ||  ||  ||  ||  ||  || 26–12 ||  ||  ||  ||  ||  ||
|-  style="background:#cfc; text-align:center;"
| 39 || May 18 || @ Royals || 5–0 ||  ||  ||  ||  ||  || 27–12 ||  ||  ||  ||  ||  ||
|-  style="background:#fcc; text-align:center;"
| 40 || May 20 || Twins || 2–3 (13)||  ||  ||  ||  ||  || 27–13 ||  ||  ||  ||  ||  ||
|-  style="background:#cfc; text-align:center;"
| 41 || May 21 || Twins || 4–3 ||  ||  ||  ||  ||  || 28–13 ||  ||  ||  ||  ||  ||
|-  style="background:#cfc; text-align:center;"
| 42 || May 22 || Twins || 6–2 ||  ||  ||  ||  ||  || 29–13 ||  ||  ||  ||  ||  ||
|-  style="background:#cfc; text-align:center;"
| 43 || May 23 || Athletics || 4–3 ||  ||  ||  ||  ||  || 30–13 ||  ||  ||  ||  ||  ||
|-  style="background:#cfc; text-align:center;"
| 44 || May 24 || Athletics || 2–1 ||  ||  ||  ||  ||  || 31–13 ||  ||  ||  ||  ||  ||
|-  style="background:#cfc; text-align:center;"
| 45 || May 25 || Athletics || 5–3 ||  ||  ||  ||  ||  || 32–13 ||  ||  ||  ||  ||  ||
|-  style="background:#fcc; text-align:center;"
| 46 || May 27 || @ Pilots || 1–8 ||  ||  ||  ||  ||  || 32–14 ||  ||  ||  ||  ||  ||
|-  style="background:#cfc; text-align:center;"
| 47 || May 28 || @ Pilots || 9–5 ||  ||  ||  ||  ||  || 33–14 ||  ||  ||  ||  ||  ||
|-  style="background:#cfc; text-align:center;"
| 48 || May 30 || @ Angels || 3–1 ||  ||  ||  ||  ||  || 34–14 ||  ||  ||  ||  ||  ||
|-  style="background:#fcc; text-align:center;"
| 49 || May 31 || @ Angels || 3–4 ||  ||  ||  ||  ||  || 34–15 ||  ||  ||  ||  ||  ||
|-

|-  style="background:#cfc; text-align:center;"
| 50 || June 1 || @ Angels || 4–3 ||  ||  ||  ||  ||  || 35–15 ||  ||  ||  ||  ||  ||
|-  style="background:#cfc; text-align:center;"
| 51 || June 3 || @ Athletics || 3–1 (11)||  ||  ||  ||  ||  || 36–15 ||  ||  ||  ||  ||  ||
|-  style="background:#cfc; text-align:center;"
| 52 || June 4 || @ Athletics || 6–1 ||  ||  ||  ||  ||  || 37–15 ||  ||  ||  ||  ||  ||
|-  style="background:#cfc; text-align:center;"
| 53 || June 6 || Pilots || 5–1 ||  ||  ||  ||  ||  || 38–15 ||  ||  ||  ||  ||  ||
|-  style="background:#cfc; text-align:center;"
| 54 || June 7 || Pilots || 10–0 ||  ||  ||  ||  ||  || 39–15 ||  ||  ||  ||  ||  ||
|-  style="background:#fcc; text-align:center;"
| 55 || June 8 || Pilots || 5–7 ||  ||  ||  ||  ||  || 39–16 ||  ||  ||  ||  ||  ||
|-  style="background:#cfc; text-align:center;"
| 56 || June 10 || Angels || 11–4 ||  ||  ||  ||  ||  || 40–16 ||  ||  ||  ||  ||  ||
|-  style="background:#fcc; text-align:center;"
| 57 || June 11 || Angels || 5–7 (14) ||  ||  ||  ||  ||  || 40–17 ||  ||  ||  ||  ||  ||
|-  style="background:#cfc; text-align:center;"
| 58 || June 13 || @ White Sox || 5–2 ||  ||  ||  ||  ||  || 41–17 ||  ||  ||  ||  ||  ||
|-  style="background:#cfc; text-align:center;"
| 59 || June 14 || @ White Sox || 12–3 ||  ||  ||  ||  ||  || 42–17 ||  ||  ||  ||  ||  ||
|-  style="background:#cfc; text-align:center;"
| 60 || June 15 || @ White Sox || 9–0 ||  ||  ||  ||  ||  || 43–17 ||  ||  ||  ||  ||  ||
|-  style="background:#cfc; text-align:center;"
| 61 || June 15 || @ White Sox || 13–2 ||  ||  ||  ||  ||  || 44–17 ||  ||  ||  ||  ||  ||
|-  style="background:#cfc; text-align:center;"
| 62 || June 17 || @ Senators || 5–1 ||  ||  ||  ||  ||  || 45–17 ||  ||  ||  ||  ||  ||
|-  style="background:#cfc; text-align:center;"
| 63 || June 18 || @ Senators || 3–1 ||  ||  ||  ||  ||  || 46–17 ||  ||  ||  ||  ||  ||
|-  style="background:#cfc; text-align:center;"
| 64 || June 19 || @ Senators || 2–0 ||  ||  ||  ||  ||  || 47–17 ||  ||  ||  ||  ||  ||
|-  style="background:#fcc; text-align:center;"
| 65 || June 20 || @ Indians || 2–7 ||  ||  ||  ||  ||  || 47–18 ||  ||  ||  ||  ||  ||
|-  style="background:#cfc; text-align:center;"
| 66 || June 20 || @ Indians || 5–1 ||  ||  ||  ||  ||  || 48–18 ||  ||  ||  ||  ||  ||
|-  style="background:#cfc; text-align:center;"
| 67 || June 21 || @ Indians || 3–1 ||  ||  ||  ||  ||  || 49–18 ||  ||  ||  ||  ||  ||
|-  style="background:#fcc; text-align:center;"
| 68 || June 22 || @ Indians || 2–3 ||  ||  ||  ||  ||  || 49–19 ||  ||  ||  ||  ||  ||
|-  style="background:#cfc; text-align:center;"
| 69 || June 22 || @ Indians || 6–0 ||  ||  ||  ||  ||  || 50–19 ||  ||  ||  ||  ||  ||
|-  style="background:#cfc; text-align:center;"
| 70 || June 23 || Senators || 5–3 ||  ||  ||  ||  ||  || 51–19 ||  ||  ||  ||  ||  ||
|-  style="background:#cfc; text-align:center;"
| 71 || June 24 || Senators || 6–3 (11)||  ||  ||  ||  ||  || 52–19 ||  ||  ||  ||  ||  ||
|-  style="background:#fcc; text-align:center;"
| 72 || June 25 || Senators || 8–11 ||  ||  ||  ||  ||  || 52–20 ||  ||  ||  ||  ||  ||
|-  style="background:#cfc; text-align:center;"
| 73 || June 27 || Tigers || 4–1 ||  ||  ||  ||  ||  || 53–20 ||  ||  ||  ||  ||  ||
|-  style="background:#cfc; text-align:center;"
| 74 || June 28 || Tigers || 6–4 ||  ||  ||  ||  ||  || 54–20 ||  ||  ||  ||  ||  ||
|-  style="background:#fcc; text-align:center;"
| 75 || June 29 || Tigers || 2–3 ||  ||  ||  ||  ||  || 54–21 ||  ||  ||  ||  ||  ||
|-  style="background:#cfc; text-align:center;"
| 76 || June 29 || Tigers || 4–3 ||  ||  ||  ||  ||  || 55–21 ||  ||  ||  ||  ||  ||
|-

|-  style="background:#fcc; text-align:center;"
| 77 || July 1 || @ Yankees || 9–10 ||  ||  ||  ||  ||  || 55–22 ||  ||  ||  ||  ||  ||
|-  style="background:#fcc; text-align:center;"
| 78 || July 2 || @ Yankees || 2–3 ||  ||  ||  ||  ||  || 55–23 ||  ||  ||  ||  ||  ||
|-  style="background:#fcc; text-align:center;"
| 79 || July 4 || @ Tigers || 1–4 (5)||  ||  ||  ||  ||  || 55–24 ||  ||  ||  ||  ||  ||
|-  style="background:#cfc; text-align:center;"
| 80 || July 5 || @ Tigers || 9–3 ||  ||  ||  ||  ||  || 56–24 ||  ||  ||  ||  ||  ||
|-  style="background:#fcc; text-align:center;"
| 81 || July 6 || @ Tigers || 4–5 ||  ||  ||  ||  ||  || 56–25 ||  ||  ||  ||  ||  ||
|-  style="background:#cfc; text-align:center;"
| 82 || July 8 || Yankees || 10–3 ||  ||  ||  ||  ||  || 57–25 ||  ||  ||  ||  ||  ||
|-  style="background:#cfc; text-align:center;"
| 83 || July 8 || Yankees || 4–1 ||  ||  ||  ||  ||  || 58–25 ||  ||  ||  ||  ||  ||
|-  style="background:#cfc; text-align:center;"
| 84 || July 9 || Yankees || 6–5 (10)||  ||  ||  ||  ||  || 59–25 ||  ||  ||  ||  ||  ||
|-  style="background:#cfc; text-align:center;"
| 85 || July 10 || Red Sox || 5–4 ||  ||  ||  ||  ||  || 60–25 ||  ||  ||  ||  ||  ||
|-  style="background:#fcc; text-align:center;"
| 86 || July 11 || Red Sox || 4–7 ||  ||  ||  ||  ||  || 60–26 ||  ||  ||  ||  ||  ||
|-  style="background:#fcc; text-align:center;"
| 87 || July 11 || Red Sox || 3–12 ||  ||  ||  ||  ||  || 60–27 ||  ||  ||  ||  ||  ||
|-  style="background:#cfc; text-align:center;"
| 88 || July 12 || Red Sox || 4–0 ||  ||  ||  ||  ||  || 61–27 ||  ||  ||  ||  ||  ||
|-  style="background:#cfc; text-align:center;"
| 89 || July 13 || Red Sox || 6–3 ||  ||  ||  ||  ||  || 62–27 ||  ||  ||  ||  ||  ||
|-  style="background:#cfc; text-align:center;"
| 90 || July 15 || Indians || 5–1 ||  ||  ||  ||  ||  || 63–27 ||  ||  ||  ||  ||  ||
|-  style="background:#fcc; text-align:center;"
| 91 || July 16 || Indians || 4–6 ||  ||  ||  ||  ||  || 63–28 ||  ||  ||  ||  ||  ||
|-  style="background:#cfc; text-align:center;"
| 92 || July 16 || Indians || 6–5 ||  ||  ||  ||  ||  || 64–28 ||  ||  ||  ||  ||  ||
|-  style="background:#cfc; text-align:center;"
| 93 || July 17 || Indians || 3–2 ||  ||  ||  ||  ||  || 65–28 ||  ||  ||  ||  ||  ||
|-  style="background:#fcc; text-align:center;"
| 94 || July 18 || @ Red Sox || 1–6 ||  ||  ||  ||  ||  || 65–29 ||  ||  ||  ||  ||  ||
|-  style="background:#fcc; text-align:center;"
| 95 || July 19 || @ Red Sox || 3–5 ||  ||  ||  ||  ||  || 65–30 ||  ||  ||  ||  ||  ||
|-  style="background:#fcc; text-align:center;"
| 96 || July 20 || @ Red Sox || 5–6 ||  ||  ||  ||  ||  || 65–31 ||  ||  ||  ||  ||  ||
|- align="center" bgcolor="bbcaff"
|colspan="3" bgcolor="#bbcaff"| July 23: All-Star Game (NL wins—) || 9–3 || Carlton (STL) || Stottlemyre (NYY) || || 45,259 || RFK Stadium || colspan=7|  Washington, D.C.
|-  style="background:#cfc; text-align:center;"
| 97 || July 24 || White Sox || 5–2 ||  ||  ||  ||  ||  || 66–31 ||  ||  ||  ||  ||  ||
|-  style="background:#cfc; text-align:center;"
| 98 || July 25 || White Sox || 4–2 ||  ||  ||  ||  ||  || 67–31 ||  ||  ||  ||  ||  ||
|-  style="background:#cfc; text-align:center;"
| 99 || July 26 || White Sox || 2–1 ||  ||  ||  ||  ||  || 68–31 ||  ||  ||  ||  ||  ||
|-  style="background:#cfc; text-align:center;"
| 100 || July 27 || White Sox || 17–0 ||  ||  ||  ||  ||  || 69–31 ||  ||  ||  ||  ||  ||
|-  style="background:#cfc; text-align:center;"
| 101 || July 29 || @ Royals || 4–1 ||  ||  ||  ||  ||  || 70–31 ||  ||  ||  ||  ||  ||
|-  style="background:#cfc; text-align:center;"
| 102 || July 30 || @ Royals || 4–2 ||  ||  ||  ||  ||  || 71–31 ||  ||  ||  ||  ||  ||
|-  style="background:#cfc; text-align:center;"
| 103 || July 31 || @ Royals || 3–1 ||  ||  ||  ||  ||  || 72–31 ||  ||  ||  ||  ||  ||
|-

|-  style="background:#fcc; text-align:center;"
| 104 || August 1 || @ Twins || 3–4 (10)||  ||  ||  ||  ||  || 72–32 ||  ||  ||  ||  ||  ||
|-  style="background:#cfc; text-align:center;"
| 105 || August 2 || @ Twins || 6–5 ||  ||  ||  ||  ||  || 73–32 ||  ||  ||  ||  ||  ||
|-  style="background:#fcc; text-align:center;"
| 106 || August 3 || @ Twins || 2–5 ||  ||  ||  ||  ||  || 73–33 ||  ||  ||  ||  ||  ||
|-  style="background:#fcc; text-align:center;"
| 107 || August 4 || @ Indians || 0–2 ||  ||  ||  ||  ||  || 73–34 ||  ||  ||  ||  ||  ||
|-  style="background:#cfc; text-align:center;"
| 108 || August 5 || Royals || 7–5 (10)||  ||  ||  ||  ||  || 74–34 ||  ||  ||  ||  ||  ||
|-  style="background:#cfc; text-align:center;"
| 109 || August 6 || Royals || 2–1 ||  ||  ||  ||  ||  || 75–34 ||  ||  ||  ||  ||  ||
|-  style="background:#cfc; text-align:center;"
| 110 || August 7 || Royals || 10–2 ||  ||  ||  ||  ||  || 76–34 ||  ||  ||  ||  ||  ||
|-  style="background:#cfc; text-align:center;"
| 111 || August 8 || Twins || 6–5 ||  ||  ||  ||  ||  || 77–34 ||  ||  ||  ||  ||  ||
|-  style="background:#cfc; text-align:center;"
| 112 || August 9 || Twins || 5–1 ||  ||  ||  ||  ||  || 78–34 ||  ||  ||  ||  ||  ||
|-  style="background:#cfc; text-align:center;"
| 113 || August 10 || Twins || 2–0 ||  ||  ||  ||  ||  || 79–34 ||  ||  ||  ||  ||  ||
|-  style="background:#fcc; text-align:center;"
| 114 || August 11 || Athletics || 4–7 ||  ||  ||  ||  ||  || 79–35 ||  ||  ||  ||  ||  ||
|-  style="background:#cfc; text-align:center;"
| 115 || August 12 || Athletics || 4–3 ||  ||  ||  ||  ||  || 80–35 ||  ||  ||  ||  ||  ||
|-  style="background:#cfc; text-align:center;"
| 116 || August 13 || Athletics || 8–0 ||  ||  ||  ||  ||  || 81–35 ||  ||  ||  ||  ||  ||
|-  style="background:#cfc; text-align:center;"
| 117 || August 15 || @ Pilots || 2–1 ||  ||  ||  ||  ||  || 82–35 ||  ||  ||  ||  ||  || 
|-  style="background:#cfc; text-align:center;"
| 118 || August 16 || @ Pilots || 15–3 ||  ||  ||  ||  ||  || 83–35 ||  ||  ||  ||  ||  ||
|-  style="background:#cfc; text-align:center;"
| 119 || August 17 || @ Pilots || 4–1 ||  ||  ||  ||  ||  || 84–35 ||  ||  ||  ||  ||  ||
|-  style="background:#cfc; text-align:center;"
| 120 || August 18 || @ Pilots || 12–3 ||  ||  ||  ||  ||  || 85–35 ||  ||  ||  ||  ||  ||
|-  style="background:#cfc; text-align:center;"
| 121 || August 19 || @ Angels || 10–0 ||  ||  ||  ||  ||  || 86–35 ||  ||  ||  ||  ||  ||
|-  style="background:#fcc; text-align:center;"
| 122 || August 20 || @ Angels || 2–3 ||  ||  ||  ||  ||  || 86–36 ||  ||  ||  ||  ||  ||
|-  style="background:#fcc; text-align:center;"
| 123 || August 21 || @ Angels || 0–2 ||  ||  ||  ||  ||  || 86–37 ||  ||  ||  ||  ||  ||
|-  style="background:#cfc; text-align:center;"
| 124 || August 22 || @ Athletics || 4–3 (10)||  ||  ||  ||  ||  || 87–37 ||  ||  ||  ||  ||  ||
|-  style="background:#fcc; text-align:center;"
| 125 || August 23 || @ Athletics || 2–4 ||  ||  ||  ||  ||  || 87–38 ||  ||  ||  ||  ||  ||
|-  style="background:#fcc; text-align:center;"
| 126 || August 24 || @ Athletics || 0–9 ||  ||  ||  ||  ||  || 87–39 ||  ||  ||  ||  ||  ||
|-  style="background:#fcc; text-align:center;"
| 127 || August 24 || @ Athletics || 8–9 (18)||  ||  ||  ||  ||  || 87–40 ||  ||  ||  ||  ||  ||
|-  style="background:#fcc; text-align:center;"
| 128 || August 26 || Pilots || 1–2 ||  ||  ||  ||  ||  || 87–41 ||  ||  ||  ||  ||  ||
|-  style="background:#cfc; text-align:center;"
| 129 || August 27 || Pilots || 7–2 ||  ||  ||  ||  ||  || 88–41 ||  ||  ||  ||  ||  ||
|-  style="background:#cfc; text-align:center;"
| 130 || August 28 || Pilots || 4–3 (11)||  ||  ||  ||  ||  || 89–41 ||  ||  ||  ||  ||  ||
|-  style="background:#fcc; text-align:center;"
| 131 || August 29 || Angels || 2–6 ||  ||  ||  ||  ||  || 89–42 ||  ||  ||  ||  ||  ||
|-  style="background:#fcc; text-align:center;"
| 132 || August 29 || Angels || 1–2 ||  ||  ||  ||  ||  || 89–43 ||  ||  ||  ||  ||  ||
|-  style="background:#cfc; text-align:center;"
| 133 || August 30 || Angels || 6–3 ||  ||  ||  ||  ||  || 90–43 ||  ||  ||  ||  ||  ||
|-  style="background:#cfc; text-align:center;"
| 134 || August 31 || Angels || 5–4 ||  ||  ||  ||  ||  || 91–43 ||  ||  ||  ||  ||  ||
|-

|-  style="background:#cfc; text-align:center;"
| 135 || September 1 || @ White Sox || 8–0 ||  ||  ||  ||  ||  || 92–43 ||  ||  ||  ||  ||  ||
|-  style="background:#fcc; text-align:center;"
| 136 || September 2 || @ White Sox || 3–10 ||  ||  ||  ||  ||  || 92–44 ||  ||  ||  ||  ||  ||
|-  style="background:#cfc; text-align:center;"
| 137 || September 4 || @ Tigers || 5–4 ||  ||  ||  ||  ||  || 93–44 ||  ||  ||  ||  ||  ||
|-  style="background:#cfc; text-align:center;"
| 138 || September 5 || @ Tigers || 8–4 ||  ||  ||  ||  ||  || 94–44 ||  ||  ||  ||  ||  ||
|-  style="background:#fcc; text-align:center;"
| 139 || September 6 || @ Tigers || 4–5 (11)||  ||  ||  ||  ||  || 94–45 ||  ||  ||  ||  ||  ||
|-  style="background:#cfc; text-align:center;"
| 140 || September 7 || @ Tigers || 6–5 (14)||  ||  ||  ||  ||  || 95–45 ||  ||  ||  ||  ||  ||
|-  style="background:#cfc; text-align:center;"
| 141 || September 9 || Senators || 6–1 ||  ||  ||  ||  ||  || 96–45 ||  ||  ||  ||  ||  ||
|-  style="background:#cfc; text-align:center;"
| 142 || September 9 || Senators || 3–2 ||  ||  ||  ||  ||  || 97–45 ||  ||  ||  ||  ||  ||
|-  style="background:#cfc; text-align:center;"
| 143 || September 10 || Red Sox || 8–7 ||  ||  ||  ||  ||  || 98–45 ||  ||  ||  ||  ||  ||
|-  style="background:#cfc; text-align:center;"
| 144 || September 11 || Red Sox || 4–2 ||  ||  ||  ||  ||  || 99–45 ||  ||  ||  ||  ||  ||
|-  style="background:#cfc; text-align:center;"
| 145 || September 12 || Indians || 2–1 ||  ||  ||  ||  ||  || 100–45 ||  ||  ||  ||  ||  ||
|-  style="background:#cfc; text-align:center;"
| 146 || September 13 || Indians || 10–5 ||  ||  ||  ||  ||  || 101–45 ||  ||  ||  ||  ||  ||
|-  style="background:#cfc; text-align:center;"
| 147 || September 14 || Indians || 7–3 ||  ||  ||  ||  ||  || 102–45 ||  ||  ||  ||  ||  ||
|-  style="background:#fcc; text-align:center;"
| 148 || September 15 || @ Senators || 2–3 ||  ||  ||  ||  ||  || 102–46 ||  ||  ||  ||  ||  ||
|-  style="background:#cfc; text-align:center;"
| 149 || September 16 || @ Senators || 1–0 ||  ||  ||  ||  ||  || 103–46 ||  ||  ||  ||  ||  ||
|-  style="background:#cfc; text-align:center;"
| 150 || September 18 || @ Red Sox || 6–4 ||  ||  ||  ||  ||  || 104–46 ||  ||  ||  ||  ||  ||
|-  style="background:#fcc; text-align:center;"
| 151 || September 18 || @ Red Sox || 0–5 ||  ||  ||  ||  ||  || 104–47 ||  ||  ||  ||  ||  ||
|-  style="background:#cfc; text-align:center;"
| 152 || September 19 || Yankees || 4–2 ||  ||  ||  ||  ||  || 105–47 ||  ||  ||  ||  ||  ||
|-  style="background:#cfc; text-align:center;"
| 153 || September 20 || Yankees || 8–7 ||  ||  ||  ||  ||  || 106–47 ||  ||  ||  ||  ||  ||
|-  style="background:#fcc; text-align:center;"
| 154 || September 23 || @ Indians || 1–3 ||  ||  ||  ||  ||  || 106–48 ||  ||  ||  ||  ||  ||
|-  style="background:#cfc; text-align:center;"
| 155 || September 24 || @ Indians || 4–3 (11)||  ||  ||  ||  ||  || 107–48 ||  ||  ||  ||  ||  ||
|-  style="background:#cfc; text-align:center;"
| 156 || September 25 || @ Indians || 4–1 ||  ||  ||  ||  ||  || 108–48 ||  ||  ||  ||  ||  ||
|-  style="background:#fcc; text-align:center;"
| 157 || September 26 || @ Yankees || 2–4 ||  ||  ||  ||  ||  || 108–49 ||  ||  ||  ||  ||  ||
|-  style="background:#fcc; text-align:center;"
| 158 || September 27 || @ Yankees || 0–1 ||  ||  ||  ||  ||  || 108–50 ||  ||  ||  ||  ||  ||
|-  style="background:#fcc; text-align:center;"
| 159 || September 28 || @ Yankees || 2–3 ||  ||  ||  ||  ||  || 108–51 ||  ||  ||  ||  ||  ||
|-  style="background:#fcc; text-align:center;"
| 160 || September 29 || Tigers || 1–4 ||  ||  ||  ||  ||  || 108–52 ||  ||  ||  ||  ||  ||
|-  style="background:#fcc; text-align:center;"
| 161 || September 30 || Tigers || 3–4 ||  ||  ||  ||  ||  || 108–53 ||  ||  ||  ||  ||  ||
|-

|-  style="background:#cfc; text-align:center;"
| 162 || October 1 || Tigers || 2–1 (10)||  ||  ||  ||  ||  || 109–53 ||  ||  ||  ||  ||  ||
|-

Player stats

Batting

Starters by position 
Note: Pos = Position; G = Games played; AB = At bats; R = Runs; H = Hits; HR = Home runs; RBI = Runs batted in; Avg. = Batting average; SB = Stolen bases

Other batters 
Note: G = Games played; AB = At bats; R = Runs; H = Hits; HR = Home runs; RBI = Runs batted in; Avg. = Batting average; SB = Stolen bases

Pitching

Starting pitchers 
Note: G = Games pitched; IP = Innings pitched; W = Wins; L = Losses; ERA = Earned run average; SO = Strikeouts

Other pitchers 
Note: G = Games pitched; IP = Innings pitched; W = Wins; L = Losses; ERA = Earned run average; SO = Strikeouts

Relief pitchers 
Note: G = Games pitched; IP = Innings pitched; W = Wins; L = Losses; SV = Saves; ERA = Earned run average; SO = Strikeouts

Postseason

ALCS

Game 1 
October 4, 1969, at Memorial Stadium

Game 2 
October 5, 1969, at Memorial Stadium

Game 3 
October 6, 1969, at Metropolitan Stadium

1969 World Series

Game log

|-  style="text-align:center;
| 1 || October 4 || Twins
|-  style="text-align:center;
| 2 || October 5 || Twins
|-  style="text-align:center;
| 3 || October 6 || @ Twins
|-

|-  style="text-align:center;
| 1 || October 11 || Mets
|-  style="text-align:center;
| 2 || October 12 || Mets
|-  style="text-align:center;
| 3 || October 14 || @ Mets
|-  style="text-align:center;
| 4 || October 15 || @ Mets
|-  style="text-align:center;
| 5 || October 16 || @ Mets
|-

Farm system 

LEAGUE CHAMPIONS: Stockton, Miami

Notes

References 

1969 Baltimore Orioles at Baseball Reference
1969 Baltimore Orioles season at Baseball Almanac

Baltimore Orioles seasons
Baltimore Orioles season
American League East champion seasons
American League champion seasons
Baltimore Orioles